Dance band can refer to:
 British dance band, a genre of popular jazz and dance music that developed in British dance halls and hotel ballrooms during the 1920s and 1930s
 Big band, a genre associated with the Swing Era
 Dansband, a type of band playing partner dance music
 Eurodance band, a genre of electronic dance music
 Dance Band, a 1935 British musical film

See also
 Goombay Dance Band, a German-based band of the 1970s